Jõetaguse is a village in Kadrina Parish, Lääne-Viru County, in northeastern Estonia. It lies on the right bank of the Loobu River, just south of Kadrina, the administrative centre of the municipality.

References

Villages in Lääne-Viru County
Kreis Wierland